Andreas Tricomitis (born August 26, 1991) is a Greek-Cypriot mixed martial artist and judoka who currently competes as a Middleweight and Welterweight. As of July 14, 2022, he is ranked #3 of pro Middleweights in Greece.

Early life 
Andreas Tricomitis was born on August 26, 1991 into a native Greek family in Larnaca, Cyprus. 

At age 4, he started training Judo and Gymnastics. By the age of 16, he earned his first Black belt in Judo under the Japanese Judo Federation in 2008.

Mixed martial arts record 

|-
|Win
|align=center| 8–0-1
|James Zackary
| KO (punches)
| BMF MMA 3
| 
|align=center| 1
|align=center| 0:19
| Barnsley, England
| 
|-
|Win
|align=center| 7–0-1
|Shaun Lomas
| Decision (unanimous)
| Full Contact Contender 28
| 
|align=center| 3
|align=center| 5:00
| Bolton, England
|
|-
|Win
|align=center| 6–0-1
|Matthew Johnson
| TKO (punches)
| BMF MMA 1
| 
|align=center| 1
|align=center| 0:27
| Barnsley, England
|
|-
|Win
|align=center| 5–0-1
|Robert Oganesyan
| TKO (punches)
| MMA Challenge Pro 9
| 
|align=center| 1
|align=center| 1:37
| Thessaloniki, Greece
|
|-
|Win
|align=center| 4-0-1
|Tom Briggs
| TKO (punches)
| Almighty Fighting Championship 10
| 
|align=center| 1
|align=center| 0:42
| York, England
|
|-
|NC
|align=center| 3–0-1
|Robert Oganesyan
| No Contest
| MMA Challenge Pro 8
| 
|align=center| 3
|align=center| 5:00
|Thessaloniki, Greece
|
|-
| Win
|align=center| 3–0
|Mark Kinsella
| Decision (split)
| Cage Warriors 90
| 
|align=center| 3
|align=center| 5:00
| Liverpool, England
|
|-
| Win
|align=center| 2–0
|Gary Kono
| Submission (arm-triangle choke)
| Prestige Fight 3
| 
|align=center| 1
|align=center| 1:59
|Larnaca, Cyprus
|
|-
| Win
|align=center| 1–0
|Rastislav Toth
| Decision (unanimous)
| Almighty Fighting Championship 5
| 
|align=center| 3
|align=center| 5:00
| Leeds, England
|

References 

1991 births
Living people
Middleweight mixed martial artists